The grain rationing system in China was imposed by the People's Republic of China in the 1950s to control the production of food and to boost industrialization. People were given grain coupons with which they could buy a certain amount of grain at a low, state-imposed price, which varied somewhat with age, profession and location. Any quantity exceeding the coupon quota would have to be purchased at market price. Urban households in China therefore face a kinked budget constraint line. With this system, urban households were able to buy grain at a cheaper price, and at the same time rural areas, once they fulfilled the state-imposed quotas, were allowed to sell the excess supply at market price.

Historical setting
Since the birth of the People's Republic of China (PRC) in 1949, China has undergone several economic transformations. Gradual reforms have shifted agricultural production in rural areas from private farming to collectivization and lastly back to household production. This is seen in two main policy eras: central planning from the 1950s until 1978, and decentralization after 1978.

Nationwide grain rationing was first established in 1955. During central planning, the government aimed to boost industrialization and growth in urban areas, enforcing policies to secure enough food from the rural areas. The state held a monopoly and therefore set both agricultural and industrial prices. Low food prices (prices set below market price) determined low wages in the countryside, which in turn allowed the state to achieve higher gains in the urban industries and to reinvest them. Through this system, money was 'extracted’ from the countryside in order to finance industrialization in the urban areas.

In the 1950s, communes were established in rural areas and the government imposed ‘procurement planning’, which required peasants to deliver a certain amount of food to the state at state-imposed prices. However, demand exceeded supply and the agricultural sector became very inefficient. The government tried to solve this problem by introducing a grain rationing system, combining consumer rationing and compulsory purchases from producers.
The gradual development of a free market put an end to the rationing system and introduced dual prices. This is where the price scissors phenomena emerged.

Grain rationing system
Figures assume that there are only two sectors (rural and urban) producing two goods (manufactures and food) and that the supply of the two goods is fixed. The amount of food that a peasant household will sell in exchange for manufactured goods can also be shown.

To solve the price scissors problem, China imposed production quotas on rural households, and urban wages were set low in order to maintain low urban food demand. In the 1950s, the grain rationing system was put in place, in which urban families were given grain coupons. The amount that the urban households could purchase was the relative price between grain and other goods, and was determined by the state. Any consumption that exceeded this could be purchased, but at the market price.

References 

Chinese economic policy
Grain production
Grain trade
Rationing by country
Regulation in China